Jo(h)n Web(b)er may refer to:

Politicians
John B. Weber (1842–1926), U.S. Representative from New York
Vin Weber (John Vincent Weber, born 1952), former Republican congressman from Minnesota
John Weber (Pennsylvania politician) (1768–1815), speaker of the Pennsylvania House of Representatives, 1810–1812
Jon Weber (politician), member of the Idaho House of Representatives
John Webber (politician), member of the Queensland Legislative Council.

Others
John Ferdinand Webber (c. 1790–1882), Texan pioneer and conductor on the southern Underground Railroad with his wife 
John Henry Weber (1779–1859), Danish-born, American fur trader and explorer
John Webber (1752–1793), English artist and explorer
Jon Weber (musician) (born 1961), American jazz pianist 
John Webber (musician) (born 1965), American jazz bassist
Jon Weber (baseball) (born 1978), baseball player
John Weber (darts player) (born 1972), Australian darts player

See also 
 Weber